The Cathedral of St. Peter the Apostle, commonly called the San Pedro Sula Cathedral, is a Roman Catholic church in San Pedro Sula, Honduras.

Location
The cathedral is located on a block along Boulevard Morazan in San Pedro Sula, situated between 2 Avenida SE and 3 Avenida SO, with its rear on 2 Calle SE. Next to it is a public park called Parque Central.

History
The cathedral was built in 1949. It was designed in the Mission Revival architectural style by architect José Francisco Zalazar. It is named for Saint Peter. It is one of the main cathedrals in Honduras, where most of the population is Roman Catholic.

According to Lonely Planet, it features "high, pale-yellow walls and pillars, and an even higher central cupola." It is decorated with hand-carved wooden statues and religious paintings of Saints.

See also
List of cathedrals in Honduras

References

Churches in Honduras
San Pedro
Roman Catholic churches completed in 1949
Hond
20th-century Roman Catholic church buildings